Open House is an EP by Christian artist Jaci Velasquez. It was released on October 30, 2007. It contains a brand new Christmas song, another previously recorded, two traditional Holiday songs and an exclusive interview with Velasquez.

Track listing
 "It Came Upon A Midnight Clear"
 "Quiet Christmas Night" (Brand New Song)
 "Auld Lang Syne"
 "The Open House Interview"

References

2007 EPs
Jaci Velasquez EPs
Christmas EPs
Interview albums
2007 Christmas albums